Some Like It Cool is a 1961 film about naturism directed by Michael Winner and starring Julie Wilson and Marc Rolland.

Premise
Jill likes to sunbathe in the nude and persuades her fiancé Roger to visit a nudist camp on their honeymoon. It was partly filmed at the Marquess of Bath's estate at Longleat.

Michael Winner, the director, liked to boast that the film's budget was recouped in two weeks.

Cast
 Julie Wilson as Jill 
 Marc Rolland as Roger 
 Wendy Smith as Joy 
 Brian Jackson as Mike Hall 
 Thalia Vickers as Jill Clark 
 Douglas Muir as Colonel Willoughby-Muir 
 Vicki Smith as Partygoer

See also
 List of British films of 1961

References

External links

1961 films
Films directed by Michael Winner
1961 comedy films
British comedy films
Films with screenplays by Michael Winner
Nudity in film
Films shot in Wiltshire
1960s English-language films
1960s British films